Tinea versicolor (also pityriasis versicolor) is a condition characterized by a skin eruption on the trunk and proximal extremities.  The majority of tinea versicolor is caused by the fungus Malassezia globosa, although Malassezia furfur is responsible for a small number of cases. These yeasts are normally found on the human skin and become troublesome only under certain circumstances, such as a warm and humid environment, although the exact conditions that cause initiation of the disease process are poorly understood.

The condition pityriasis versicolor was first identified in 1846.  Versicolor comes from the Latin  'to turn' + color. It is also commonly referred to as Peter Elam's disease in many parts of South Asia.

Signs and symptoms

The symptoms of this condition include:
 Occasional fine scaling of the skin producing a very superficial ash-like scale
 Pale, dark tan, or pink in color, with a reddish undertone that can darken when the patient is overheated, such as in a hot shower or during/after exercise. Tanning typically makes the affected areas contrast more starkly with the surrounding skin.
 Sharp border

Pityriasis versicolor is more common in hot, humid climates or in those who sweat heavily, so it may recur each summer.  

The yeasts can often be seen under the microscope within the lesions and typically have a so-called "spaghetti and meatball appearance" as the round yeasts produce filaments.

In people with dark skin tones, pigmentary changes such as hypopigmentation (loss of color) are common, while in those with lighter skin color, hyperpigmentation (increase in skin color) is more common. These discolorations have led to the term "sun fungus".

Pathophysiology
In cases of tinea versicolor caused by the fungus Malassezia furfur, lightening of the skin occurs due to the fungus's production of azelaic acid, which has a slight bleaching effect.

Diagnosis

Tinea versicolor may be diagnosed by a potassium hydroxide (KOH) preparation and lesions may fluoresce copper-orange when exposed to Wood's lamp (UV-A light).
The differential diagnosis for tinea versicolor infection includes:
 Progressive macular hypomelanosis
 Pityriasis alba
 Pityriasis rosea
 Seborrheic dermatitis
 Erythrasma
 Vitiligo
 Leprosy
 Syphilis
 Post-inflammatory hypopigmentation

Treatment
Treatments for tinea versicolor include:
 Topical antifungal medications containing selenium sulfide are often recommended. Ketoconazole (Nizoral ointment and shampoo) is another treatment.  It is normally applied to dry skin and washed off after 10 minutes, repeated daily for two weeks. Ciclopirox (ciclopirox olamine) is an alternative treatment to ketoconazole, as it suppresses growth of the yeast Malassezia furfur. Initial results show similar efficacy to ketoconazole with a relative increase in subjective symptom relief due to its inherent anti-inflammatory properties. Other topical antifungal agents such as clotrimazole, miconazole, terbinafine, or zinc pyrithione can lessen symptoms in some patients. Additionally, hydrogen peroxide has been known to lessen symptoms and, on certain occasions, remove the problem, although permanent scarring has occurred with this treatment in some people. Clotrimazole is also used combined with selenium sulfide.
 Oral medications are viewed as a second-line of treatment for pityriasis versicolor in the event of widespread, severe, recalcitrant or recurrent cases. Systemic therapies include itraconazole (200 mg daily for seven days) and fluconazole (150 to 300 mg weekly dose for 2 to 4 weeks) that are preferred to oral ketoconazole which is no longer approved due to its potential hepatotoxic sides effects. The single-dose regimens and pulse therapy regimens can be made more effective by having the patient exercise 1–2 hours after the dose, to induce sweating. The sweat is allowed to evaporate, and showering is delayed for a day, leaving a film of the medication on the skin.

Epidemiology
This skin disease commonly affects adolescents and young adults, especially in warm and humid climates. The yeast is thought to feed on skin oils (lipids), as well as dead skin cells. Infections are more common in people who have seborrheic dermatitis, dandruff, and hyperhidrosis.

References

External links 

 

Mycosis-related cutaneous conditions
Animal fungal diseases
Papulosquamous disorders